The 2017 World Short Track Speed Skating Championships took place from 10 to 12 March 2017 in Rotterdam, Netherlands and were the 42nd World Short Track Speed Skating Championships.

Medal summary

Medal table

Men

Women

References

External links
Official website
ISU website
Results book

2017
World Short Track Championships
International speed skating competitions hosted by the Netherlands
2017 World Short Track Championships
World Short Track Championships
World Short Track
21st century in Rotterdam